Tamara Ivanovna Erofeyeva (born June 29, 1937) is a Soviet-Russian linguist. She is a Doctor of Philology, served as Dean of the philological faculty at Perm State University (1982 - 1988), is a leader of Sociolinguistic study of urban language, head of the school of Socio- and Psycholinguistics in the Department of General and Slavonic Linguistics at Perm State National Research University, and is an Honorary Figure of Russian Higher Education.

Works 

Some of her works include:

 Список научных трудов профессора Т. И. Ерофеевой 
 Талант учителя — в его учениках: К юбилею Тамары Ивановны Ерофеевой 
 отв. ред. Б. В. Кондаков; Перм. гос. нац. иссл. ун-т. — Пермь, 2012. С. 13-33

References

External links 
 Personal Page at Perm State National Research University's Official Page.
 Page at "Perm Culture Encyclopedia"

1937 births
Soviet philologists
20th-century philologists
Russian philologists
Women linguists
Women philologists
Linguists from Russia
Perm State University alumni
Academic staff of Perm State University
Living people